Excel Township is a township in Marshall County, Minnesota, United States. The population was 280 at the 2000 census.

Excel Township was organized in 1884, and named after Excelsior, Minnesota.

Geography

Demographics
As of the census of 2000, there were 280 people, 103 households, and 83 families residing in the township.  The population density was 6.0 people per square mile (2.3/km2).  There were 110 housing units at an average density of 2.3/sq mi (0.9/km2).  The racial makeup of the township was 99.64% White, and 0.36% from two or more races.

There were 103 households, out of which 35.9% had children under the age of 18 living with them, 78.6% were married couples living together, 1.0% had a female householder with no husband present, and 19.4% were non-families. 15.5% of all households were made up of individuals, and 5.8% had someone living alone who was 65 years of age or older.  The average household size was 2.72 and the average family size was 3.06.

In the township the population was spread out, with 26.4% under the age of 18, 4.3% from 18 to 24, 30.7% from 25 to 44, 28.2% from 45 to 64, and 10.4% who were 65 years of age or older.  The median age was 39 years. For every 100 females, there were 104.4 males.  For every 100 females age 18 and over, there were 112.4 males.

The median income for a household in the township was $47,813, and the median income for a family was $50,833. Males had a median income of $26,458 versus $29,063 for females. The per capita income for the township was $15,511.  About 3.3% of families and 5.6% of the population were below the poverty line, including 6.0% of those under the age of eighteen and none of those 65 or over.

References

Townships in Marshall County, Minnesota
Townships in Minnesota